Graham Scott Steele is an American attorney and policy advisor. In July 2021, Steele was nominated by President Joe Biden to serve as Assistant Secretary of the Treasury for Financial Institutions. Steele currently serves as director of the Corporations and Society Initiative at the Stanford Graduate School of Business (GSB).

Prior to this, Steele served in a variety of political roles, including as Democratic chief counsel on the Senate Banking Committee and as an aide to Senator Sherrod Brown of Ohio.

Early life and education 
Originally from Brookline, Massachusetts, Steele attended the University of Rochester for his undergraduate education, where he received a degree in political science in 2002. Steele studied law at George Washington University Law School in Washington, D.C., and joined the Massachusetts State Bar after graduation.  His childhood nicknames were "Granimal" and "The Colonel."

Career 
Steele began his career as a policy counsel at Public Citizen, a consumer advocacy organization. Prior to joining the GSB, served on the staff of the Federal Reserve Bank of San Francisco and as legislative assistant to Senator Sherrod Brown, who currently chairs the Senate Banking Committee. Steele was a senior fellow at the American Economic Liberties Project (AELP), an anti-monopoly organization.

Nomination to Treasury Department
On July 19, 2021, Steele was nominated as Assistant Secretary of the Treasury for Financial Institutions, a position that oversees the federal Office of Financial Institutions. Steele's nomination was praised by environmentalist group Evergreen Action, which stated in a press release that Steele "understands the systemic risk that climate change poses to the financial system, and is committed to leading federal regulators in confronting these dangers." Brown, Steele's former employer, also endorsed the nomination, stating that Steele's support for combatting income inequality makes him a strong fit for the role.

On September 21, 2021, the Senate Banking Committee held hearings on Steele's nomination. The committee voted to favorably report Steele's nomination to the Senate floor on October 5, 2021. On November 16, 2021, the entire Senate confirmed Steele's nomination in a vote of 53-42.

Views 
Steele is considered a member of the progressive wing of the Democratic Party, having supported the presidential campaign of Elizabeth Warren in 2020. Steele has indicated his opposition to the renomination of Jerome Powell as Chair of the Federal Reserve.

Climate policy 
In a March 2020 paper published in the Cornell Journal of Law and Public Policy, Steele argued that the Dodd–Frank Wall Street Reform and Consumer Protection Act of 2010 (Dodd-Frank) law gave federal officials the power to use macroprudential regulation to address climate-related financial risks. According to Steele, federal bodies with this power include the Financial Stability Oversight Council as well as the Federal Reserve.

According to a Wall Street Journal article about his nomination, Steele believes that the Federal Reserve "could use its authority to limit fossil-fuel investments based on their prospective risks to financial stability..."

Derivatives regulations 
In a 2019 letter to the Federal Deposit Insurance Corporation (FDIC), Steele argued in favor of restricting derivatives trading to minimize the risk the market poses to the global economy.

References 

Washington University School of Law alumni
University of Rochester alumni
Public Citizen
People from Brookline, Massachusetts
United States Assistant Secretaries of the Treasury
Biden administration personnel
Living people
Year of birth missing (living people)